L'italiana in Algeri (The Italian Girl in Algiers) is an operatic dramma giocoso in two acts by Gioachino Rossini to an Italian libretto by Angelo Anelli, based on his earlier text set by Luigi Mosca. It premiered at the Teatro San Benedetto in Venice on 22 May 1813. The music is characteristic of Rossini's style, remarkable for its fusion of sustained, manic energy with elegant, pristine melodies.

Composition history
Rossini wrote L'italiana in Algeri when he was 21. Rossini stated that he composed the opera in 18 days, though other sources claim that it took him 27 days. Rossini entrusted the composition of the recitatives as well as the aria "Le femmine d'Italia" to an unknown collaborator. The opera is notable for Rossini's mixing of opera seria style with opera buffa. The overture is widely recorded and performed today, known for its distinct opening of slow, quiet pizzicato basses, leading to a sudden loud burst of sound from the full orchestra. This "surprise" reflects Rossini's early admiration for Joseph Haydn, whose Symphony No. 94 in G major, "The Surprise Symphony", is so named for the same shocking and semi-comic effect.

Performance history
The work was first performed at the Teatro San Benedetto, Venice on 22 May 1813. It was a notable success and Rossini made progressive changes to the work for later performances in Vicenza, Milan and Naples, during the following two years.

The opera was first presented in London at His Majesty's Theatre on 28 January 1819 and on 5 November 1832 in New York. It fell somewhat out of favour as the 19th century progressed, but notable performances were presented from the 1920s in "Turin (1925), Rome (1927) and London (1935)"  and it has been revived frequently since World War II with many successful productions. In the 21st century, Rossini’s opera continues to be performed regularly.

Roles

Synopsis

Place: Algiers
Time: The past

Act 1
The palace of the Bey of Algiers

Elvira accompanied by her slave Zulma regrets the loss of the love of her husband, the Turkish Bey Mustafà. Left alone with Haly (since the Italian 'h' is silent, this corresponds to the name Ali, more familiar in the English-speaking world), Captain of the Corsairs, Mustafà reveals his plan to marry Elvira off to Lindoro, his Italian slave. The Bey is bored with his submissive harem, desiring a new challenge to his virility: he wants an Italian girl, and Haly must find one! Lindoro enters alone and sings about Isabella, his true love (Languir per una bella). Mustafà comes in to explain Lindoro's impending marriage. The enthusiastic Bey describes the attractions of the match, while Lindoro struggles to refuse (Se inclinassi a prender moglie).

The seashore

A ship has been wrecked in a storm. Its passengers include Isabella, in search of Lindoro, and Taddeo, her travelling companion and would-be lover. Isabella enters with a sorrowful cavatina Cruda sorte! Amor tiranno!, however she is not afraid (Già so per pratica) and will master the situation. Haly and his men take them prisoner. She passes off Taddeo as her uncle. Haly is delighted to learn she is an Italian – exactly what the Bey wanted! Left to consider their fate, Isabella is irritated by Taddeo's jealousy of Lindoro (Ai capricci della sorte), but they resolve to join forces.

The palace

Back in the palace, Lindoro and Elvira do not wish to marry, but Mustafà offers Lindoro passage on a ship returning to Italy if he takes Elvira. Lindoro agrees, admitting a vague possibility of marrying her in Italy. Haly enters with news of the arrival of the Italian beauty. Mustafà is elated (Già d'insolito ardore nel petto agitare).

Surrounded by eunuchs (Viva, viva il flagel delle donne), Mustafà receives Isabella in a grand hall. He is enchanted, though she is rather amused by his appearance (Oh! Che muso, che figura!). At that moment, Lindoro, Elvira and Zulma arrive to say goodbye to Mustafà (Pria di dividerci da voi, Signore). Lindoro and Isabella are astonished to come face to face. Recovering herself, Isabella asks about Elvira, learning she is Mustafà's ex-wife, who is being sent away to Italy, where she is to marry Lindoro.  Isabella demands that Mustafà allow Elvira (and therefore Lindoro) to remain in Algiers, telling Mustafà that he does not know how to love (Voi non sapete amar).  Mustafà capitulates to Isabella's insistence. The act ends with an ensemble of confusion (Confusi e stupidi).

Act 2
In the palace

Elvira and Zulma note Isabella's skill with men. Mustafà reveals his strategy for seducing Isabella: he installs Lindoro as Isabella's servant and his informer, and Taddeo will also be induced to help. Elvira and Zulma must tell Isabella he is coming to take coffee with her.

Isabella and Lindoro are alone. He explains that he had no intention of marrying Elvira. They agree to escape together and Lindoro sings of his happiness (Ah come il cor di giubilo). Mustafà enters with a reluctant Taddeo, acclaimed by the Turks as "Lord Kaimakan" (Viva il grande Kaimakan). He dislikes interceding with Isabella for the Bey, but is frightened to refuse (Ho un gran peso sulla testa).

In her apartment

Isabella is dressing in Turkish style. Zulma and Elvira deliver Mustafà's message: he is coming for coffee. Isabella orders three cups. Elvira should wait in a side room. As Mustafà approaches, Isabella sings a romantic cavatina, Per lui che adoro – she will receive him. Mustafà tells Taddeo to leave when he sneezes (Ti presento di mia man). Isabella greets Mustafà warmly and he sneezes, but Taddeo ignores the signal. Isabella calls for coffee and then – to Mustafà's horror and amazement – invites Elvira to join them.

Elsewhere in the palace

Haly sings in praise of the women of Italy (Le femmine d'Italia). The Italians enter, and Taddeo reveals to a surprised Lindoro that he is not her uncle but her lover (he himself is unaware of the other man's true identity). Lindoro tells Mustafà that Isabella will declare him her adored pappataci ("sandfly," literally "silent eater": a man unable to resist the opposite sex). This, as Lindoro explains (Pappataci! Che mai sento!), is an Italian custom and a great honour, as the pappataci enjoy an idyllic life dedicated to eating, drinking and sleeping. Zulma and Haly speculate about Isabella's real intentions and the quantity of alcohol ordered for the ceremony.

Isabella's apartment

She addresses the Italian slaves who will be pappataci in the ceremony – she will lead them to freedom (Pensa alla patria). The ceremony begins (Dei pappataci s'avanza il coro); Mustafà is delighted with his new honour and changes into appropriate costume. Isabella explains his obligations. He must swear an oath of eating, drinking, and keeping silent, repeating the words after Taddeo. Following that his oath is tested, under provocation by Isabella and Lindoro.

A European ship lies alongside the palace: time to escape! Taddeo finally realizes who Lindoro is, but decides to go along with them anyway. Elvira, Zulma and Haly find the Bey still acting as a mad pappataci. Suddenly recovering his sanity, Mustafà calls his troops but they are all drunk. The Italians bid farewell and Mustafà begs Elvira's forgiveness. No more Italian girls for him!

Recordings

References
Notes

Sources
 Beghelli, Marco & Gallino, Nicola (ed.) (1991), Tutti i libretti di Rossini, Milan: Garzanti.  
Osborne, Charles (1994), The Bel Canto Operas of Rossini, Donizetti, and Bellini, London: Methuen; Portland, Oregon: Amadeus Press.

Further reading
 Fabbri, Paolo & Bertieri, Maria Chiara (ed.) (1997), L'italiana in Algeri, Pesaro: Fondazione "G. Rossini" 
Gossett, Philip; Brauner, Patricia (2001), "L'italiana in Algeri" in Holden, Amanda (ed.), The New Penguin Opera Guide, New York: Penguin Putnam. 
Osborne, Richard (1990), Rossini, Ithaca, New York: Northeastern University Press. 
Osborne, Richard (1998), "L'italiana in Algeri", in Stanley Sadie (Ed.), The New Grove Dictionary of Opera, vol. 2, pp. 833–836. London: Macmillan Publishers, Inc.

External links

Libretto (in Italian)
 L'Italiana in Algeri: online opera guide and synopsis

Operas by Gioachino Rossini
Italian-language operas
Drammi giocosi
1813 operas
Operas
Operas set in the Maghreb